Mullet is a village in Tirana County, Albania. At the 2015 local government reform it became part of the municipality Tirana. It lies at an elevation of 551 feet (167 m).

Notable people
Sulejman Bargjini, founder of the town of Tirana.

References

External links

Populated places in Tirana
Villages in Tirana County